Rodrigo Gonçalves de Oliveira Lopes Silva (born November 16, 1982 in São Paulo) is a Brazilian football forward who currently plays for Customs United in the Thai League 3 Lower region.
He previously played professionally in the Segunda División for SD Huesca.

Career

He began his career in Rio Branco PR. Later, in the 2005/2006 season, Silva emigrated first to the European continent to enlist in the ranks of Sandefjord of Norway.

Silva returned to Brazil to join Guarulhos Esporte before joining in KÍ Klaksvík of the Faroe Islands. Then, he went to Azerbaijan to play in Standard Sumgayit.

In the 2009/2010 season, Silva moved to Nea Salamis in Cyprus. On 3 March 2010, he signed a contract with SD Huesca until the end of the season, and an option to stay one more year.

In July 2010, he moved to Shanghai East Asia.

Career statistics

Club

References

1982 births
Living people
Brazilian footballers
Association football forwards
Rio Branco Sport Club players
Sandefjord Fotball players
Grêmio Esportivo Juventus players
KÍ Klaksvík players
FK Standard Sumgayit players
Nea Salamis Famagusta FC players
SD Huesca footballers
Shanghai Port F.C. players
Rodrigo Silva
Campeonato Brasileiro Série C players
Brazilian expatriate footballers
Norwegian First Division players
Brazilian expatriate sportspeople in Norway
Expatriate footballers in Norway
Faroe Islands Premier League players
Brazilian expatriate sportspeople in the Faroe Islands
Expatriate footballers in the Faroe Islands
Azerbaijan Premier League players
Brazilian expatriate sportspeople in Azerbaijan
Expatriate footballers in Azerbaijan
Cypriot First Division players
Brazilian expatriate sportspeople in Cyprus
Expatriate footballers in Cyprus
Segunda División players
Brazilian expatriate sportspeople in Spain
Expatriate footballers in Spain
China League One players
Brazilian expatriate sportspeople in China
Expatriate footballers in China
Rodrigo Silva
Brazilian expatriate sportspeople in Thailand
Expatriate footballers in Thailand
Footballers from São Paulo